The Bunglebungle robust slider (Lerista bunglebungle)  is a species of skink found in Western Australia.

References

Lerista
Reptiles described in 1991
Taxa named by Glen Milton Storr